Casbah is a 1948 American film noir crime musical film directed by John Berry starring Yvonne De Carlo, Tony Martin, Peter Lorre, and Märta Torén. It was nominated for an Academy Award for Best Original Song for the song "For Every Man There's a Woman".

It is a musical remake of Algiers (1938), which was in turn an American remake of the French film Pépé le Moko (1937).

Plot
Pépé le Moko (Tony Martin) leads a gang of jewel thieves in the Casbah district of Algiers, where he has exiled himself to escape imprisonment in his native France. Inez (Yvonne De Carlo), his girl friend, is infuriated when Pépé flirts with Gaby (Märta Torén), a French visitor, but Pépé tells her to mind her own business.

Detective Slimane (Peter Lorre) is trying to lure Pépé out of the Casbah so he can be jailed. Against Slimane's advice, Police Chief Louvain (Thomas Gomez) captures Pépé in a dragnet, but his followers free him. Inez realizes that Pépé has fallen in love with Gaby and intends to follow her to Europe. Slimane knows the same and uses her as the bait to lure Pépé out of the Casbah.

Cast
 Yvonne De Carlo – Inez
 Tony Martin – Pépé Le Moko
 Peter Lorre – Slimane
 Märta Torén – Gaby
 Hugo Haas – Omar
 Thomas Gomez – Louvain
 Douglas Dick – Carlo
 Herbert Rudley – Claude
 Gene Walker – Roland
 Curt Conway – Maurice
 Katherine Dunham – Odette

Cast notes:
 Eartha Kitt plays an uncredited bit part. This was her film debut.
 Kathleen Freeman plays an uncredited American Woman

Production
The film was made by Marston Productions, Tony Martin's production company, who signed a deal with Universal. Tony Martin was keen to re-establish himself in the film industry after having been blacklisted in the entertainment industry since being discharged from the Navy for "unfitness" in 1942. He was charged with buying a Navy officer a car to facilitate his obtaining a chief specialists rating.

It was the first production from Marston, which Martin owned with his agent, Nat Gould. The Bank of America lent $800,000 to finance the film; Universal provided some of the balance.

Yvonne de Carlo signed to play the female lead in June 1947. Erik Charrell was to produce, William Bowers was to write the script and Harold Arlen to do the music. John Berry signed to direct.

Märta Torén made her film debut here.

Soundtrack
Songs by Harold Arlen (music) and Leo Robin (lyrics).

 "For Every Man There's a Woman", sung by Tony Martin.
 "Hooray for Love", sung by Tony Martin and Yvonne De Carlo.
 "It Was Written in the Stars", sung by Tony Martin.
 "What's Good About Goodbye", sung by Tony Martin.

Reception
The film only recouped $600,000 of its negative cost. By September 24, 1949 the film had earned rentals of $1,092,283.

Lawsuits
Marston sued Universal in January 1949 for $250,000, alleging improper distribution. Universal counter-sued in May for $325,439, including the $320,439.25 Universal provided to the filmmakers, and $5,000 which Universal claimed Marston distributed contrary to their agreement.

Universal succeeded in getting a court judgment against Marston of $350,000. A judge ordered that the film be sold to auction for $329,486. Universal bought all rights to the film at public auction for $5,000. This purchase was subject to an unsatisfied lien against the property of $195,000 to the Bank of America.

Martin had to go to court again to argue (successfully) that he was entitled to claim his loss on the film as a tax deduction.

Awards
In 1949, the film was nominated for an Academy Award for Best Original Song for the song "For Every Man There's a Woman" by Harold Arlen (music) and Leo Robin (lyrics).

References

External links
 
 Casbah at TCMDB
 
 

1948 films
American black-and-white films
Films directed by John Berry
Films scored by Walter Scharf
Films set in Algiers
1948 musical films
Musical film remakes
Films based on adaptations
Universal Pictures films
American musical films
1940s English-language films
1940s American films